Adrianna Biedrzyńska (born 30 March 1962, in Toruń, Poland) is a Polish actress. She performed in more than thirty films since 1983. She is best known for her performance as Anka in Decalogue IV.

She works well in both dramatic and comedy roles, although the actress herself admits that she feels better in comic roles. In 2008, she made a guest appearance in Katowice at the Rialto Kinoteater in the title role in the musical comedy for children Flea Szachrajka, in which she was partnered with, among others Rafał Sawicki. 

In her theater work, she had the opportunity to collaborate, among others with directors such as Janusz Bukowski, Adam Hanuszkiewicz, Barbara Sass. Critics positively assessed her role as Marina in Pericles, the ruler of Tire (1984), although the performance itself was not successful.

Selected filmography

References

External links
 

1962 births
Living people
Polish film actresses
Polish stage actresses
People from Toruń
20th-century Polish actresses
21st-century Polish actresses
Actors from Bydgoszcz
Actors from Białystok